Mior Dani Armin bin Mior Ariffen (born 19 January 1999) is a Malaysian footballer who plays as a midfielder for Malaysia Super League club Kedah Darul Aman on loan from Kelantan.

Mior Dani started his football career playing for PKNS youth team around 2018 before joined Selangor II in 2020.

Club career

Loan to Sri Pahang
On 8 June 2022, Mior Dani joined Malaysia Super League club Sri Pahang for 6-month loan for the remaining 2022 season. On 25 June 2022, Mior Dani made his debut for the club in a 0–3 defeat against Negeri Sembilan.

Loan to Kedah Darul Aman
On 30 December 2022, Mior Dani joined Kedah Darul Aman on loan for the 2023 season.

International career
On 21 August 2018, Mior Dani was selected for the preliminary training camp Malaysia U-19, ahead of the 2018 AFC U-19 Championship.

Career statistics

Club

References

External links
 

1999 births
People from Selangor
Living people
Malaysian footballers
PKNS F.C. players
Kelantan F.C. players
Sri Pahang FC players
Kedah Darul Aman F.C. players
Malaysia Super League players
Association football midfielders